John Steele (November 16, 1764 – August 14, 1815) was a planter, Federalist legislator, comptroller of the U.S. Treasury, and member of the United States House of Representatives from the state of North Carolina between 1790 and 1793.

Life and career
Born in Salisbury, North Carolina in 1764, the son of Elizabeth Maxwell Gillespie and William Steele, John Steele attended Clio's Nursery and the English School, both near his hometown. Named assessor in 1784 and a town commissioner in 1787, Steele was first elected to the North Carolina House of Commons from the Salisbury District in 1787 and served again multiple times: in 1788, 1794, 1795, 1806, and from 1811 to 1813. He was Speaker of the House in 1811.  He was a delegate to the U.S. Constitutional convention in Hillsborough in 1788 and to the 1789 convention in Fayetteville which ratified the U.S. Constitution, and was a special commissioner from North Carolina to treat with the Cherokee and Chickasaw Indians from 1788 to 1790.

From April 19, 1790, until March 3, 1793, Steele was a member of the United States House of Representatives. A Federalist, he was considered Pro-Administration. He opposed assumption of the state debt by the Federal government and the excise tax on whiskey.

On July 1, 1796, Steele was appointed Comptroller of the Treasury by President George Washington; he was reappointed by Presidents Adams and Jefferson until his resignation on December 15, 1802. In 1805, Steele was appointed to the board of commissioners tasked with determining the dividing lines between North Carolina, South Carolina, and Georgia, where he served until 1814.

Death
Steele died on August 14, 1815, in his hometown of Salisbury; that same day, he had been elected again to the North Carolina House of Commons. He is buried in Salisbury's Chestnut Hill Cemetery.

Legacy
The John Steele House was listed on the National Register of Historic Places in 1994.

References

1764 births
1815 deaths
Members of the North Carolina House of Representatives
Members of the United States House of Representatives from North Carolina
North Carolina Federalists
Comptrollers of the United States Treasury
People from Rowan County, North Carolina
18th-century American politicians
19th-century American politicians